The Hollywood Black Film Festival (HBFF), dubbed the "Black Sundance," is an annual six-day film festival held in Los Angeles, California dedicated to enhancing the careers of new and established black filmmaking professionals by bringing their work to the attention of the film industry, press and public. It is open to the public. 

Films screened at the festival include the 2006 documentary Bastards of the Party, director John Singleton's box office blockbuster "2 Fast 2 Furious," the critically acclaimed "The Hurricane" (starring Academy Award winner Denzel Washington), director Kasi Lemmons' "The Caveman's Valentine" (starring Samuel L. Jackson), and director Reggie Rock Bythewood's "Dancing In September."

Attendance
The festival attracts such stars and industry insiders as Academy Award winners Forest Whitaker and Sidney Poitier, John Singleton, Spike Lee, Cedric The Entertainer, George Tillman, Ice-T, Rev. Run (of Run DMC), Tina Andrews, Reuben Cannon, Anthony Anderson, Blair Underwood, Sanaa Lathan, Rockmond Dunbar, Loretta Devine, Bill Duke, Sheryl Underwood, Vanessa Williams, Clifton Powell and Gina Ravera.

History and purpose
HBFF was founded in 1998 by its executive director Tanya Kersey, in order to enhance the careers of emerging and established black filmmakers through a public exhibition and competition program. The festival's goal is to play an integral role in discovering and launching independent films and filmmakers by bringing them to the attention of the industry, press and public.

Format
In addition to the film screenings, the adjunct Infotainment Conference features dozens of informational seminars, panels and workshops covering a wide variety of topics which range from film production, distribution and marketing to pitching, writing for television and film, in addition to specific programs of interest to actors. Each year, more than 100 top film and television executives, filmmakers, producers, directors, writers, agents, attorneys, business managers and actors participate in the talk-show style panels, roundtable discussions and workshops.

A highlight of the Infotainment Conference is "A Conversation With…" a series of up-close-and-personal candid conversations with some of the industry's hottest movers and shakers. HBFF has been honored to have directors John Singleton ("2 Fast 2 Furious," "Baby Boy," "Shaft," "Boyz N The Hood"), George Tillman ("Soul Food, Barbershop") and St. Clair Bourne ("The Life and Works of Gordon Parks," "John Henrick Clarke: A Great and Mighty Walk") and scribe Tina Andrews ("Why Do Fools Fall in Love?") participate in these enlightening and informative discussions.

The HBFF Pitchathon is for filmmakers and storytellers hoping to sell their idea, story, book or screenplay to Hollywood buyers. Participants get to pitch their story ideas to entertainment industry executives (film directors and producers, acquisitions, development, production and distribution executives), talent agents and greenlighters (people who make decisions on whether or not to "greenlight" a project) who will critique their concept/idea to examine its commercial potential in the today's film marketplace.

Awards 
The juried HBFF Filmmaker & Storyteller Awards honor the achievements of the most promising black filmmakers and screenwriters. Films that screen during the festival compete for the following jury awards:
 Best Feature,
 Best Documentary,
 Best Short,
 Best Student Film,
 HBFF Audience Choice Award.
A separate HBFF Storyteller Competition awards scribes for their excellence in screenwriting. Closing Night is highlighted by the announcement of the crowd-favorite HBFF Audience Choice Award, which is selected by audience vote.

See also

 List of film festivals
 Film Festivals
 Pan African Film Festival
 Independent film

References

External links
Hollywood Black Film Festival profile
Facebook Page

Film festivals in Los Angeles
African-American film festivals
African-American history in Los Angeles
African Americans in California